Stephen Kaye is a judge of the Supreme Court of Victoria.

Stephen Kaye may also refer to:

Stephen Kaye of the Kaye baronets
Steve Kaye, musician
Stephen Kaye, chairman of Hay Group

See also
Stephen Kay, American actor, director and film writer
Stephen Kay (architect), American golf course architect
Steven Kay, model